Silver–Russell syndrome (SRS), also called Silver–Russell dwarfism, is a rare congenital growth disorder. In the United States it is usually referred to as Russell–Silver syndrome (RSS), and Silver–Russell syndrome elsewhere. It is one of 200 types of dwarfism and one of five types of primordial dwarfism.

Silver–Russell syndrome occurs in approximately one out of every 50,000 to 100,000 births.  Males and females seem to be affected with equal frequency.

Signs and symptoms
Although confirmation of a specific genetic marker is in a significant number of individuals, there are no tests to clearly determine if this is what a person has. As a syndrome, a diagnosis is typically given for children upon confirmation of the presence of several symptoms listed below.

Symptoms are intrauterine growth restriction (IUGR) combined with some of the following:
 Often small for gestational age (SGA) at birth (birth weight less than 2.8 kg)
 Feeding problems: the baby is uninterested in feeding and takes only small amounts with difficulty
 Hypoglycemia
 Excessive sweating as a baby, especially at night, and a greyness or pallor of the skin. This may be a symptom of hypoglycemia
 Triangular face with a small jaw and a pointed chin that tends to lessen slightly with age. The mouth tends to curve down
 A blue tinge to the whites of the eyes in younger children
 Head circumference may be of normal size and disproportionate to a small body size
 Wide and late-closing fontanelle
 Clinodactyly
 Body asymmetry: one side of the body grows more slowly than the other
 Continued poor growth with no "catch up" into the normal centile lines on growth chart
 Precocious puberty (occasionally)
 Low muscle tone
 Gastroesophageal reflux disease
 A striking lack of subcutaneous fat
 Constipation (sometimes severe)

The average adult height for patients without growth hormone treatment is 4'11" for males and 4'7" for females.

Cause
Its exact cause is unknown, but present research points toward a genetic and epigenetic component, possibly following maternal genes on chromosomes 7 and 11.

It is estimated that approximately 50% of Silver–Russell patients have hypomethylation of H19 and IGF2. This is thought to lead to low expression of IGF2 and over-expression of the H19 gene.

In 10% of the cases the syndrome is associated with maternal uniparental disomy (UPD) on chromosome 7. This is an imprinting error where the person receives two copies of chromosome 7 from the mother (maternally inherited) rather than one from each parent.

Other genetic causes such as duplications, deletions and chromosomal aberrations have also linked to Silver–Russell syndrome.

Interestingly, Silver–Russell patients have variable hypomethylation levels in different body tissues, suggesting a mosaic pattern and a postzygotic epigenetic modification issue. This could explain the body asymmetry of the SRS phenotype.

Like other imprinting disorders (e.g. Prader–Willi syndrome, Angelman syndrome, and Beckwith–Wiedemann syndrome), Silver–Russell syndrome may be associated with the use of assisted reproductive technologies such as in vitro fertilization.

Diagnosis
For many years the diagnosis of Silver–Russell syndrome was clinical. However, this led to overlaps with syndromes with similar clinical features such as Temple syndrome and 12q14 microdeletion syndrome. In 2017, an international consensus was published – detailing the steps clinicians should take to diagnose Silver–Russell syndrome. It is now recommended to test for 11p15 loss of methylation and mUPD7 first. If they are negative, then testing for mUPD16, mUPD20 should take place. Testing for 14q32 should also be considered, to rule out Temple syndrome as a differential diagnosis. If these tests come back inconclusive, then a clinical diagnosis should be made.

It is recommended that the Netchine-Harbison clinical scoring system (NH-CSS) is used to group the clinical features together in a point based score.

Treatment
The caloric intake of children with SRS must be carefully controlled in order to provide the best opportunity for growth. If the child is unable to tolerate oral feeding, then enteral feeding may be used, such as the percutaneous endoscopic gastrostomy.

In children with limb-length differences or scoliosis, physiotherapy can alleviate the problems caused by these symptoms. In more severe cases, surgery to lengthen limbs may be required. To prevent aggravating posture difficulties children with leg length differences may require a raise in their shoe.

Growth hormone therapy is often prescribed as part of the treatment of SRS.  
The hormones are given by injection typically daily from the age of 2 years old through teenage years. 
It may be effective even when the patient does not have a growth hormone deficiency. 
Growth hormone therapy has been shown to increase the rate of growth in patients and consequently prompts 'catch up' growth. 
This may enable the child to begin their education at a normal height, improving their self-esteem and interaction with other children. 
Several studies have shown that growth hormone therapy significantly improves childhood growth and final adult height.
There are some theories suggesting that the therapy also assists with muscular development and managing hypoglycemia.

Eponym
It is named for Henry Silver and Alexander Russell.

References

External links 

 GeneReviews/NCBI/NIH/UW entry on Russell-Silver Syndrome

Genodermatoses
Growth disorders
Syndromes with dysmelia
Syndromes affecting stature
Rare syndromes